Parramore is a neighborhood in west-central Orlando, Florida, US.

Parramore may also refer to:

Places
 Holden–Parramore Historic District
 Parramore Island, Accomack County, Virginia, US; a barrier island in Chesapeake Bay, see Parramore Island Natural Area Preserve
 Parramore Island Natural Area Preserve, a nature preserve on the island

People
 Bruce Parramore, American filmmaker
 James B. Parramore (1840-1902) Mayor of Orlando, Florida, US
 Makeba Wilbourn (born 1973, nee Parramore), American psychologist
 Thomas C. Parramore (1932-2004), American historian

Sports
 Handsworth Parramore F.C., the Parramore soccer team from Handsworth, Sheffield, South Yorkshire, England, UK
 Parramore Sports F.C., a soccer team from Worksop, Nottinghamshire, England, UK

See also

 
 
 Parramore Springs, California, US; an unincorporated community in Lake County
 Paramour (disambiguation)
 Paramore (disambiguation)
 Paramor (disambiguation)